Lauren Lindsey Donzis (born July 28, 2004) is an American actress, best known for starring as Molly in the Netflix series No Good Nick and as Ruby in the fourth season of the Disney Channel original series Liv and Maddie.

Donzis stars in the revival of the 1980s series Punky Brewster, playing Hannah, the daughter of Soleil Moon Frye's Punky Brewster, who is now a single mother of three. The series premiered in February 2021 on NBC's Peacock.

Filmography

References

External links

 

Living people
2004 births
American television actresses
21st-century American actresses